Feliciano López and Stefanos Tsitsipas defeated Marcelo Arévalo and Jean-Julien Rojer in the final, 7–5, 6–4 to win the doubles title at the 2022 Mexican Open.

Ken and Neal Skupski were the defending champions, but chose to play in Dubai instead.

Seeds

Draw

Draw

Qualifying

Seeds

Qualifiers
  Luke Saville /  John-Patrick Smith

Lucky losers

Qualifying draw

References

External links
 Main draw
 Qualifying draw

Abierto Mexicano Telcel - Doubles
Men's Doubles